A Woman Is a Risky Bet: Six Orchestra Conductors  (Swedish: Dirigenterna) is a 1987 Swedish documentary film about women orchestra conductors directed by Christina Olofson.

Description
In A Woman Is a Risky Bet we meet six women who have broken their way into a man's world – the world of conducting.

Christina Olofson takes us to New York City, Moscow, Stockholm and Oslo to meet them. The film covers preparations, rehearsals and parts of concerts. At home, alone with the conductor's score, they give us their account of the work of the conductor, of their convictions and their love for music.

The skepticism towards women conductors and musicians by some becomes obvious in a visit to the Vienna Philharmonic Orchestra as well as in interviews with international impresarios. Conductors Sixten Ehrling and Jorge Mester make comments on what they believe is the prevailing conservative attitudes among colleagues.

The rehearsal and concert scenes in the film reveal the strengths and weaknesses of the featured conductors;  Falletta leading the Queens Philharmonic in Stravinsky's The Rite of Spring,  Dudarova with the Moscow State Symphony Orchestra and Choir rehearsing Mozart's Requiem, Nerbe conducting Mozart's Linz Symphony and Kolchinsky directing  von Weber's overture to the opera Euryanthe.

"Only poor soldiers don't want to be generals." – Veronika Dudarova

See also
 Antonia: A Portrait of the Woman, a 1974 documentary about the struggles of symphony conductor Antonia Brico against gender bias

References

External links
 

1987 films
Swedish documentary films
 
 
Documentary films about classical music and musicians
1987 documentary films
Documentary films about women in music
1980s Swedish films